Bradley Halsman (born 12 April 1993) is a Scottish footballer, currently playing as a midfielder for Nairn County in the Highland League.

Career
Halsman began his career as a youth player with Aberdeen, before joining Motherwell where he was captain of their under 17–squad.

Partick Thistle
He was released by Motherwell in June 2011, before joining Scottish First Division side Partick Thistle on a Modern Apprenticeship deal, where he initially joined up with their under 19–squad. On 28 April 2012, he was promoted to the first team where he made his debut from the start in a 1–1 draw with Falkirk.

In November 2012, Halsman joined Albion Rovers on loan until 6 January 2013. After making five appearances so far, Halsman loan spell was extended until 20 February 2013. After making seven appearances, Halsman returned to Partick Thistle.

In conclusion of 2012–13 season, Halsman was released along with many youngsters as Partick Thistle prepares to play in the Scottish Premier League.

Nairn County
After appearing as a trialist for a few games, Halsman signed for Nairn County in 2014.

Career statistics

Personal life
He is the brother of fellow footballer Jordan Halsman.

References

1993 births
Living people
Footballers from Glasgow
Scottish footballers
Association football midfielders
Aberdeen F.C. players
Motherwell F.C. players
Partick Thistle F.C. players
Scottish Football League players
Nairn County F.C. players
Highland Football League players